Shorty is a nickname which may refer to:

 Joseph Armone (1917–1992), New York City gangster
 Shorty Baker (1914–1966), American jazz trumpeter
 Shorty Barr (1897–1957), American  National Football League player and player-coach
 Shorty Cantlon (1904–1947), American race car driver
 Gordon Carpenter (1919–1988), American basketball player
 Shorty Castro (1928–2018), Puerto Rican comedian, actor, and musician
 George V. Chalmers (1907–1984), American college football, basketball and baseball player
 Allen Daniels (born 1959), former Australian rules footballer
 Shorty Dee (1889–1971), Canadian baseball shortstop
 Paul Des Jardien (1893–1956), American football, baseball and basketball player, member of the College Football Hall of Fame
 Shorty Ellsworth (1881–1963), American football player and coach
 Shorty Elness (1906–1965), American football player
 Shorty Fuller (1867–1904), American Major League Baseball player
 Shorty Gallagher (1872–1924), baseball player
 Shorty Green (1896–1960), Canadian National Hockey League player
 Shorty Hamilton (1879–1925), American silent film actor and comedian
 Shorty Hogue, middleweight boxer in the 1940s
 George Horne (ice hockey) (1904–1929), Canadian National Hockey League player
 Shorty Howe, a baseball player
 Shorty Hughes (1922–2003), American football coach
 Shorty Jenkins (1935–2013), ice technician in the sport of curling
 Vernon Keogh (1911–1941), American World War II fighter pilot
 Shorty Long (1940–1969), American soul singer, songwriter, musician and record producer
 Frank Longman (1882–1928), American college football player and coach
 Shorty Mack (born 1981), producer, rapper, and actor
 Shorty McMillan (1890–1964), American football quarterback for the University of Michigan
 Shorty McWilliams (1926–1997), American football player
 Shorty Medlocke (1912–1982), American delta blues and hard rock musician and composer
 Shorty Miller (1890–1966), American football quarterback for Penn State, member of the College Hall of Fame
 Frank Moniz (1911–2004), American soccer player
 Shorty Price (1921–1980), American attorney and perennial political candidate
 Clyde Propst (1898–1959), American college football coach
 Shorty Ransom (1898–1959), American football coach and college athletics administrator
 Hugh "Shorty" Ray (1884–1956), longtime Supervisor of Officials for the National Football League, member of the Pro Football Hall of Fame
 George Redding (1900–1974), Canadian National Hockey League player
 Shorty Rogers (1924–1994), American musician and arranger, one of the principal creators of West Coast jazz
 Shorty Rollins (1929–1998), American race car driver
 Shorty Rossi (born 1969), American actor and star of the reality TV series Pit Boss
 Shorty Sherock (1915–1980), American swing jazz trumpeter
 Rob Short (born 1972), field hockey player for Canada
 Jimmy Slagle (1873–1956), American Major League Baseball player
 Shorty Templeman (1919–1962), American racecar driver
 Shorty Lungkata Tjungurayyi (1920–1987), artist
 George Williams (basketball) (1899–1961), American basketball player in the 1920s
 Irvin Yeaworth (1926–2004), German-born American film director, producer, screenwriter and theme park builder

See also
 Joaquín Guzmán Loera (born 1954 or 1957), Mexican former drug lord known as "El Chapo Guzmán" ('The Shorty Guzmán')
 Diego Schwartzman (born 1992), Argentine tennis player nicknamed "El Peque" (an abbreviation of the word pequeño, meaning 'Shorty' in Spanish)
 Shorty (disambiguation)
 Boston Shorty, nickname of pool player Morton Goldberg

Shorty